Vehicle instrument is an instrument that measures some parameters in the vehicle, often found on its control panel or dashboard.

Types 

Speedometer
Tachometer
Odometer
Trip odometer
Oil pressure gauge
Coolant Temperature gauge
Battery/Charging system lamp
Low oil pressure lamp
Airbag lamp
Coolant overheat lamp
Hand-brake lamp
Door ajar lamp
High beam lamp
 On-board diagnosis indicator/Check engine lamp
Fuel gauge
Low fuel lamp
Hand brake indicator
Turn light
Engine service indicator
Seat belt indicator

 
Part